John Burnette Hollingsworth (December 26, 1895 in Jacksboro, Tennessee – January 4, 1990 in Knoxville, Tennessee) was a pitcher in Major League Baseball. He pitched from 1922 to 1928.

External links

1895 births
1990 deaths
People from Jacksboro, Tennessee
Baseball players from Tennessee
Major League Baseball pitchers
Brooklyn Robins players
Pittsburgh Pirates players
Washington Senators (1901–1960) players
Boston Braves players
Wichita Falls Spudders players
Minneapolis Millers (baseball) players
Portland Beavers players
Buffalo Bisons (minor league) players
Baltimore Orioles (IL) players
Chattanooga Lookouts players